Muhammad Zia-Ur-Rahman, ndc, psc, is a retired  two-star-rank major general of Bangladesh Army. He was the pioneer and first General Officer Commanding of ARTDOC.

References

Bangladeshi military personnel